Argon (18Ar) has 26 known isotopes, from 29Ar to 54Ar and 1 isomer (32mAr), of which three are stable (36Ar, 38Ar, and 40Ar). On the Earth, 40Ar makes up 99.6% of natural argon. The longest-lived radioactive isotopes are 39Ar with a half-life of 268 years, 42Ar with a half-life of 32.9 years, and 37Ar with a half-life of 35.04 days. All other isotopes have half-lives of less than two hours, and most less than one minute. The least stable is 29Ar with a half-life of approximately  seconds.

The naturally occurring 40K, with a half-life of 1.248 years, decays to stable 40Ar by electron capture (10.72%) and by positron emission (0.001%), and also transforms to stable 40Ca via beta decay (89.28%). These properties and ratios are used to determine the age of rocks through potassium–argon dating.

Despite the trapping of 40Ar in many rocks, it can be released by melting, grinding, and diffusion. Almost all of the argon in the Earth's atmosphere is the product of 40K decay, since 99.6% of Earth atmospheric argon is 40Ar, whereas in the Sun and presumably in primordial star-forming clouds, argon consists of < 15% 38Ar and mostly (85%) 36Ar.  Similarly, the ratio of the three isotopes 36Ar:38Ar:40Ar in the atmospheres of the outer planets is measured to be 8400:1600:1.

In the Earth's atmosphere, radioactive 39Ar (half-life 268(8) years) is made by cosmic ray activity, primarily from 40Ar. In the subsurface environment, it is also produced through neutron capture by 39K or alpha emission by calcium. The content of 39Ar in natural argon is measured to be of (8.0±0.6)×10−16 g/g, or (1.01±0.08) Bq/kg of 36, 38, 40Ar. The content of 42Ar (half-life 33 years) in the Earth's atmosphere is lower than 6×10−21 parts per part of 36, 38, 40Ar. Many endeavors require argon depleted in the cosmogenic isotopes, known as depleted argon. Lighter radioactive isotopes can decay to different elements (usually chlorine) while heavier ones decay to potassium.

36Ar, in the form of argon hydride, was detected in the Crab Nebula supernova remnant during 2013. This was the first time a noble molecule was detected in outer space.

Radioactive 37Ar is a synthetic radionuclide that is created from the neutron capture by 40Ca followed by an alpha particle emission as a result of subsurface nuclear explosions. It has a half-life of 35 days.

List of isotopes

|-
| 29Ar
| style="text-align:right" | 18
| style="text-align:right" | 11
| 
| ~ s
| 2p
| 27S
| 
|
|
|-
| 30Ar
| style="text-align:right" | 18
| style="text-align:right" | 12
| 30.02247(22)
| <10 ps
| 2p
| 28S
| 0+
|
|
|-
| rowspan=4|31Ar
| rowspan=4 style="text-align:right" | 18
| rowspan=4 style="text-align:right" | 13
| rowspan=4|31.01216(22)#
| rowspan=4|15.1(3) ms
| β+, p (68.3%)
| 30S
| rowspan=4|5/2+
| rowspan=4|
| rowspan=4|
|-
| β+ (22.63%)
| 31Cl
|-
| β+, 2p (9.0%)
| 29P
|-
| β+, 3p (0.07%)
| 28Si
|-
| rowspan=2|32Ar
| rowspan=2 style="text-align:right" | 18
| rowspan=2 style="text-align:right" | 14
| rowspan=2|31.9976378(19)
| rowspan=2|98(2) ms
| β+ (64.42%)
| 32Cl
| rowspan=2|0+
| rowspan=2|
| rowspan=2|
|-
| β+, p (35.58%)
| 31S
|-
| style="text-indent:1em" | 32mAr
| colspan="3" style="text-indent:2em" | 5600(100) keV
| unknown
|
|
| 5−#
|
|
|-
| rowspan=2|33Ar
| rowspan=2 style="text-align:right" | 18
| rowspan=2 style="text-align:right" | 15
| rowspan=2|32.9899255(4)
| rowspan=2|173.0(20) ms
| β+ (61.3%)
| 33Cl
| rowspan=2|1/2+
| rowspan=2|
| rowspan=2|
|-
| β+, p (38.7%)
| 32S
|-
| 34Ar
| style="text-align:right" | 18
| style="text-align:right" | 16
| 33.98027009(8)
| 843.8(4) ms
| β+
| 34Cl
| 0+
|
|
|-
| 35Ar
| style="text-align:right" | 18
| style="text-align:right" | 17
| 34.9752577(7)
| 1.7756(10) s
| β+
| 35Cl
| 3/2+
|
|
|-
| 36Ar
| style="text-align:right" | 18
| style="text-align:right" | 18
| 35.967545105(29)
| colspan=3 align=center|Observationally Stable
| 0+
| 0.003336(4)
|
|-
| 37Ar
| style="text-align:right" | 18
| style="text-align:right" | 19
| 36.96677631(22)
| 35.011(19) d
| EC
| 37Cl
| 3/2+
|
|
|-
| 38Ar
| style="text-align:right" | 18
| style="text-align:right" | 20
| 37.96273210(21)
| colspan=3 align=center|Stable
| 0+
| 0.000629(1)
|
|-
| 39Ar
| style="text-align:right" | 18
| style="text-align:right" | 21
| 38.964313(5)
| 268(8) y
| β−
| 39K
| 7/2−
| Trace
|
|-
| 40Ar
| style="text-align:right" | 18
| style="text-align:right" | 22
| 39.9623831238(24)
| colspan=3 align=center|Stable
| 0+
| 0.996035(4)
|
|-
| 41Ar
| style="text-align:right" | 18
| style="text-align:right" | 23
| 40.9645006(4)
| 109.61(4) min
| β−
| 41K
| 7/2−
|
|
|-
| 42Ar
| style="text-align:right" | 18
| style="text-align:right" | 24
| 41.963046(6)
| 32.9(11) y
| β−
| 42K
| 0+
| Trace
|
|-
| 43Ar
| style="text-align:right" | 18
| style="text-align:right" | 25
| 42.965636(6)
| 5.37(6) min
| β−
| 43K
| 5/2(−)
|
|
|-
| 44Ar
| style="text-align:right" | 18
| style="text-align:right" | 26
| 43.9649238(17)
| 11.87(5) min
| β−
| 44K
| 0+
|
|
|-
| 45Ar
| style="text-align:right" | 18
| style="text-align:right" | 27
| 44.9680397(6)
| 21.48(15) s
| β−
| 45K
| (5/2,7/2)−
|
|
|-
| 46Ar
| style="text-align:right" | 18
| style="text-align:right" | 28
| 45.9680374(12)
| 8.4(6) s
| β−
| 46K
| 0+
|
|
|-
| rowspan=2|47Ar
| rowspan=2 style="text-align:right" | 18
| rowspan=2 style="text-align:right" | 29
| rowspan=2|46.9727681(12)
| rowspan=2|1.23(3) s
| β− (99.8%)
| 47K
| rowspan=2|(3/2−)
| rowspan=2|
| rowspan=2|
|-
| β−, n (0.2%)
| 46K
|-
| 48Ar
| style="text-align:right" | 18
| style="text-align:right" | 30
| 47.97608(33)
| 415(15) ms
| β−
| 48K
| 0+
|
|
|-
| 49Ar
| style="text-align:right" | 18
| style="text-align:right" | 31
| 48.98155(43)#
| 236(8) ms
| β−
| 49K
| 3/2−#
|
|
|-
| 50Ar
| style="text-align:right" | 18
| style="text-align:right" | 32
| 49.98569(54)#
| 106(6) ms
| β−
| 50K
| 0+
|
|
|-
| 51Ar
| style="text-align:right" | 18
| style="text-align:right" | 33
| 50.99280(64)#
| 60# ms [>200 ns]
| β−
| 51K
| 3/2−#
|
|
|-
| 52Ar
| style="text-align:right" | 18
| style="text-align:right" | 34
| 51.99863(64)#
| 10# ms
| β−
| 52K
| 0+
|
|
|-
| rowspan=2|53Ar
| rowspan=2 style="text-align:right" | 18
| rowspan=2 style="text-align:right" | 35
| rowspan=2|53.00729(75)#
| rowspan=2|3# ms
| β−
| 53K
| rowspan=2|(5/2−)#
| rowspan=2|
| rowspan=2|
|-
| β−, n
| 52K
|-
| 54Ar
| style="text-align:right" | 18
| style="text-align:right" | 36
| 
| 
| β−
| 54K
| 0+
|
|

See also

References

External links
Argon isotopes data from The Berkeley Laboratory Isotopes Project's

 
Argon
Argon